Stalina Sergeyevna Demidova-Korzukhina (born 10 February 1938) is a retired Russian alpine skier. She competed in the downhill, slalom and giant slalom events at the 1960 and 1964 Olympics, with the best achievement of seventh place in the slalom in 1960. Between 1960 and 1963 she won 11 national titles in alpine events.

Demidova-Korzukhina graduated from the Siberian Academy of Physical Culture in Omsk, and after retiring from competition coached alpine events in Saint Petersburg.

References

1938 births
Living people
Soviet female alpine skiers
Olympic alpine skiers of the Soviet Union
Alpine skiers at the 1960 Winter Olympics
Alpine skiers at the 1964 Winter Olympics